This is a list of the best selling singles, albums and as according to IRMA. Further listings can be found here.

Top-selling singles
"When We Collide" – Matt Cardle
"Under Pressure (Ice Ice Baby)" – Jedward featuring Vanilla Ice
"Horse Outside" – Rubberbandits
"Love the Way You Lie" – Eminem featuring Rihanna
"Only Girl (In the World)" – Rihanna
"Just the Way You Are" – Bruno Mars
"Fireflies" – Owl City
"Telephone" – Lady Gaga featuring Beyoncé
"Firework" – Katy Perry
"California Gurls" – Katy Perry featuring Snoop Dogg

Top-selling albums
Science & Faith – The Script
Progress – Take That
Crazy Love – Michael Bublé
Loud - Rihanna
The Fame/The Fame Monster – Lady Gaga
Sigh No More – Mumford & Sons
Sunny Side Up – Paolo Nutini
Lungs – Florence & The Machine
My World – Justin Bieber
Glee: The Music, Volume 1 - Glee Cast

Notes:
 *Compilation albums are not included.

References 

2010 in Irish music
Ireland Top sellers
2010